James McCann (died 1873) was an Irish Liberal, Whig and Independent Irish Party politician.

McCann was first elected Independent Irish Party Member of Parliament (MP) for Drogheda at the 1852 general election and—standing as a Whig in 1857 and Liberal in 1859—held the seat until 1865 when he did not seek re-election.

References

External links
 

UK MPs 1852–1857
UK MPs 1857–1859
UK MPs 1859–1865
1873 deaths
Irish Liberal Party MPs
Whig (British political party) MPs for Irish constituencies
Irish Nationalist politicians
Members of the Parliament of the United Kingdom for County Louth constituencies (1801–1922)